Marius Mihai Burlacu (born 29 October 1985) is a Romanian professional footballer who plays as a midfielder for FC Brașov.

Honours
Corona Brașov
Liga III: 2020–21
Liga IV: 2019–20

References

External links
 
 

1985 births
Living people
Sportspeople from Brașov
Romanian footballers
Association football midfielders
Liga I players
Liga II players
CSM Ceahlăul Piatra Neamț players
CSU Voința Sibiu players
FC Olimpia Satu Mare players
Sepsi OSK Sfântu Gheorghe players
SR Brașov players
CSM Corona Brașov footballers
FC Brașov (2021) players